Larry Delgado (born 1936) is an American politician who served as the mayor of Santa Fe, New Mexico from 1998 to 2006. He previously served two terms on the Santa Fe City Council, from 1990 to 1998.

Career 
He was elected mayor of Santa Fe in 1998 after defeating mayor Debbie Jaramillo and former mayor Sam Pick. In that election, he was viewed as taking a more centrist option between Jaramillo's anti-development policies and Pick's pro-development policies. He received 44% of the vote, ahead of Pick's 32% and Jaramillo's 11%. Delgado served two full terms as mayor, leaving office in 2006.

Delgado was appointed to the New Mexico Racing Commission by Governor Bill Richardson in 2006.

References

External links
 Racing Commissioner Larry Delgado
 Larry Delgado short bio from Google Books

1936 births
Living people
Mayors of Santa Fe, New Mexico
Hispanic and Latino American mayors